Pectolite is a white to gray mineral, NaCa2Si3O8(OH), sodium calcium hydroxide inosilicate. It crystallizes in the triclinic system typically occurring in radiated or fibrous crystalline masses. It has a Mohs hardness of 4.5 to 5 and a specific gravity of 2.7 to 2.9. The gemstone variety, larimar, is a pale to sky blue.

Occurrence

It was first described in 1828 at Mount Baldo, Trento Province, Italy and named  	from the Greek pektos – "compacted" and lithos – "stone". 

It occurs as a primary mineral in nepheline syenites, within hydrothermal cavities in basalts and diabase and in serpentinites in association with zeolites, datolite, prehnite, calcite and serpentine. It is found in a wide variety of worldwide locations.

See also
Serandite - the manganese analogue

References

External links
Mineral galleries

Sodium minerals
Calcium minerals
Inosilicates
Gemstones
Triclinic minerals
Luminescent minerals
Minerals in space group 2